County Clare was a parliamentary constituency in Ireland, represented in the Parliament of the United Kingdom. From 1801 to 1885 it returned two Members of Parliament (MPs) to the House of Commons of the United Kingdom of Great Britain and Ireland.

At the 1885 general election, County Clare was split into two divisions: East Clare and West Clare.

Boundaries 
This constituency comprised the whole of County Clare, except for the borough of Ennis.

Members of Parliament

Elections

Elections in the 1820s

Elections in the 1830s 

 
 
 

 

 

On petition, Mahon was unseated and a by-election was called.

 
 

 
 

 
 

 
 

 Lucius O'Brien and Vandeleur declined the contest

Elections in the 1840s

Elections in the 1850s 

 

On petition, Fitzgerald and O'Brien were unseated, due to a "system of intimidation" being present at the 1852 election, and a writ was moved for a by-election.

Elections in the 1860s 
On petition, White was unseated, causing a by-election.

Calcutt died, causing a by-election.

O'Loghlen was appointed Judge Advocate General of the Armed Forces, requiring a by-election.

Elections in the 1870s 

O'Loghlen's death caused a by-election.

 

 O'Loghlen was a Liberal home rule supporter, while The O'Gorman Mahon was a Nationalist home rule supporter. Burton also supported home rule.

O'Loghlen was declared to have resigned after accepting office as Attorney General of Victoria, Australia, causing a by-election.

Elections in the 1880s 

There was a notorious riot at Sixmilebridge on polling day in 1852, in which soldiers shot dead seven protesters.

The Clare by-election in 1828 was notable as this was the first time since the reformation that an openly Roman Catholic MP, Daniel O'Connell was elected.

References 

 The Parliaments of England by Henry Stooks Smith (1st edition published in three volumes 1844–50), 2nd edition edited (in one volume) by F.W.S. Craig (Political Reference Publications 1973)
 
 

Westminster constituencies in County Clare (historic)
Constituencies of the Parliament of the United Kingdom established in 1801
Constituencies of the Parliament of the United Kingdom disestablished in 1885